Romeo Is Bleeding is a 2015 documentary film directed by Jason Zeldes focusing on poets and students of Richmond, California as they prepare an adaptation of Romeo and Juliet based on the decades-long violent conflict between the neighborhoods of North and Central Richmond. The film explores the sources of this conflict and includes voices from citizens, city government, and the Richmond police department.

The primary focus of the film is poet Donté Clark. It premiered April 29, 2015 as part of the San Francisco International Film Festival at the El Cerrito High School theater where the play, Té's Harmony, was originally staged. The Mercury News, in an article about the festival, called Romeo Is Bleeding "one of the best in the bunch."

References

External links
 

2015 films
2015 documentary films
American documentary films
Films set in the San Francisco Bay Area
Documentary films about African-American gangs
Documentary films about theatre
Romeo and Juliet
African-American theatre
Richmond, California
Documentary films about California
2010s English-language films
2010s American films